The Brooks Locomotive Works manufactured railroad steam locomotives and freight cars from 1869 through its merger into the American Locomotive Company (ALCO) in 1901.

History
When the New York and Erie Railroad (NY&E) relocated its shops facilities from Dunkirk, New York, to Buffalo in 1869, Dunkirk lost its largest employer.  Coming to the city's rescue was Horatio G. Brooks (1828–1887), the former chief engineer of the NY&E who was at the controls of the first train into Dunkirk in 1851.  In 1869, Brooks leased the Dunkirk shops facility from the NY&E and formed the Brooks Locomotive Works.  The new company officially opened on November 13, 1869.  The company's first steam locomotive was completed the following month as part of an order for the NY&E, the company's first customer.

Within a couple of years of its opening, Brooks was producing as many as seven new locomotives per month, compared to one per month while the facility was controlled by the NY&E.  Brooks built locomotives for nearly all of the major railroads of the time, producing 37 new locomotives in its first year and 43 new locomotives in its second year of operations.

After the financial crisis of 1873, orders for new equipment dropped off, but Brooks was able to recover enough business to avoid bankruptcy.  Brooks locomotives were displayed a few years later at the National Railway Appliance Exhibition in Chicago, where they were judged the Best in Show. Brooks locomotives were also favorably received and awarded at the World's Columbian Exposition in 1893.

The 1890s brought another period of depressed sales following another financial crisis. The company produced 226 new locomotives in 1891, but only 90 new locomotives in 1894. Brooks also gained positive publicity for building some exceptionally large locomotives at the end of the 19th century, including locomotives for both Great Northern Railway and Illinois Central Railroad that were hailed as being the largest in the world. However Brooks was not able to recover business as easily as the previous downturn and, following brief participation in a widespread strike by machinists in May, the company was merged with several other manufacturers in 1901 to form the American Locomotive Company. The last Brooks locomotive, serial number 3883, built for the Lake Shore Railroad, was completed on June 22, 1901.

Horatio Brooks died in April 1887; he was succeeded as president of the company by his son-in-law, Edward Nichols.  Nichols died on January 7, 1892, and was succeeded by then vice president Marshall L. Hinman.  Hinman resigned from the presidency in December 1896 to be succeeded by another of H.G. Brooks's sons-in-law, Frederick H. Stevens.  Stevens led the company until the merger with Alco in 1901.

Following the merger, the Brooks plant built one of the first orders booked by ALCO, consisting of fifteen 2-8-0 locomotives for Mexican Central Railroad.  ALCO produced locomotives at this facility until 1934 when the shop was renamed ALCO Thermal Products Division.  Locomotives produced at the former Brooks plant after ALCO's formation came to be known as ALCO-Brooks locomotives.

Although new locomotives were no longer being produced at the former Brooks shops in Dunkirk, shop forces were kept busy for some time building spare parts for ALCO locomotives.  Production had shifted from locomotives to heat exchangers, high-pressure vessels and pipes of all sizes.

After World War II, production at the Dunkirk plant never got back to its prewar levels.  ALCO finally closed the facility in 1962.

Timeline
 November 11, 1869: Horatio Brooks leases the shops facility in Dunkirk and officially opens the Brooks Locomotive Works
 1883: Brooks locomotives are named the Best in Show locomotives at the National Railway Appliance Exhibition in Chicago.
 February 22, 1884: Brooks completes its 1,000th new locomotive.
 November 30, 1891: Brooks completes its 2,000th new locomotive.
 July 23, 1898: Brooks completes its 3,000th new locomotive.
 1901: Brooks and several other locomotive manufacturers are merged into the American Locomotive Company
 1934: New locomotive construction at the Brooks plant ends as the plant is renamed ALCO Thermal Products Division.
 1962: ALCO closes the former Brooks plant in Dunkirk, laying off the remaining 750 laborers at the facility.

Preserved Brooks locomotives
Brooks Locomotive Works sold locomotives to all of the major railroads of the late 19th century.  Following is a partial list (in serial number order) of Brooks-built locomotives that have been spared the scrapper's torch.

References

 
 
 

Defunct locomotive manufacturers of the United States
History of Buffalo, New York
Manufacturing companies established in 1869
Manufacturing companies disestablished in 1901
1869 establishments in New York (state)
1901 disestablishments in New York (state)
1901 mergers and acquisitions